John Glassford of Dougalston and Whitehill (1715 – 27 August 1783) was a Scottish Tobacco Lord, considered by his contemporaries to be the greatest of the era. He owned tobacco plantations in Virginia and Maryland, as a result, his name is synonymous with Glasgow's link with the slave trade.

Background and early life
Glassford was born in Paisley, the third son of James Glassford, a merchant and burgess in Paisley. Glassford went on to marry first a merchant's daughter, then a baronet's, then an earl's. His immense wealth allowed for the construction or purchase of a number of major properties in and around Glasgow; Whitehill, Shawfield and Dougalston, from which he took his title, are the most notable. He appeared to pride himself on home improvements, especially on the Dougalston estate, where he enacted an extensive programme of planting and building, and even the creation of an artificial lake, Dougalston Loch. The Glassford Family Portrait, commissioned from artist Archibald McLauchlan in 1766 – and currently exhibited in Glasgow's People's Palace – shows Glassford with members of his family in their city home the Shawfield Mansion. This house stood on what is now Glassford Street in Glasgow, named in his honour.<ref
 name=strath>Curiosities of Glasgow citizenship: JOHN GLASSFORD [ebook chapter] / George Stewart, 1881</ref> Glassford sired fourteen children in all, though only eight survived to adulthood. The portrait also features the faint outline of a Black servant, which serves to highlight Glassford's involvement in the slave trade.

Tobacco trade

From 1710 Glasgow became the focus of an economic boom which lasted nearly fifty years. This was the age of the Tobacco Lords, the nouveau riche of the mid eighteenth century.

In 1742 Glassford joined his brother-in-law Archibald Ingram in his Calico Printworks at Pollokshaws. In or before 1745 he bought the ruinous mansion of Shawfield which was the target of the Malt tax riots in 1726 and previously the home of John Campbell of Mamore. He acquired this central site largely due to the land it stood on (now the site of Glassford Street). On Christmas Day 1745 Bonnie Prince Charlie arrived and billeted at the ruinous Shawfield for ten days.

Around 1760 he built Whitehill House to the north-east of Glasgow.

Glassford entered the tobacco trade in 1750 further invited by Archibald Ingram to create Ingram & Glassford. He soon made a success of his venture, with a fleet of vessels and a large number of tobacco stores across New England. Celebrated in his lifetime, Glassford was the most extensive ship owner of his generation in Scotland, and one of the four merchants who laid the foundation of the commercial greatness of Glasgow through the tobacco trade. Tobias Smollett wrote of a meeting with Glassford in 1771:

In business Glassford was not confined to traffic from the colonies. He had begun his career in the 1740s with various manufacturing interests and with his tobacco wealth he continued this patronage. Almost all of the principle manufacturing establishments in Glasgow had his support, and he was a leading partner in the Glasgow Arms and Thistle Banks. However, it was the tobacco trade that was to be his financial downfall. The American War of Independence (1775–83) ruined Glasgow's part in the trade, and while other tobacco lords were shrewd enough to sell their shares in the business before the crash, Glassford was not among them.

When he died, at his home, Shawfield Mansion, on 27 August 1783, he had debts of over £93,000. He is buried in Ramshorn Cemetery on Ingram Street in Glasgow.

Family life

Glassford married the sister of Archibald Ingram as either his first or second wife.

Glassford married, as his third wife, Margaret Mackenzie (d. 29 March 1773), sixth daughter of George Mackenzie, 3rd Earl of Cromartie. From this marriage he had:
James, advocate, Sheriff-Depute of Dumbartonshire, who died 28 July 1845
Isabella
Euphemia.

Legacy
As one of Glasgow's leading 'tobacco lords', modern recognition of Glassford has been surprisingly sparse considering his contribution to the mercantile history of Glasgow. This is a fact that was recognised in 1881 by George Stewart who in his collection Glasgow's Old Commercial Aristocracy noted that Glassford was "at one time the very prince of Glasgow merchants, and now almost forgotten".

Notes

References
Devine, Tom The Tobacco Lords: A Study of the Tobacco Merchants of Glasgow and their Trading Activities, 1740–1790 (John Donald, 1975)
Oliver, Neil, A History of Scotland, Phoenix, Orion Books, London (2009)

External links
The Glasgow Story Retrieved June 2012

1715 births
1783 deaths
People associated with Glasgow
Burgesses in Scotland
Businesspeople from Paisley, Renfrewshire
Scottish people of the British Empire
Scottish landowners
Scottish merchants